

Results

References

Team relay